The 2017–18 Israeli Basketball State Cup was the 58th edition of the Israeli Basketball State Cup, organized by the Israel Basketball Association.

The Final Four of the tournament was held from February 12–15 in the Menora Mivtachim Arena in Tel Aviv.

Hapoel Holon won its second State Cup title after an 86–84 win over Maccabi Tel Aviv in the Final. Glen Rice Jr. was named Final MVP

First round 
Maccabi Tel Aviv, Hapoel Jerusalem, Hapoel Holon, Maccabi Ashdod, Maccabi Haifa and Hapoel Be'er Sheva B.C. were pre-qualified for the Round of 16 and did not have to play in the first round.

Round of 16

Quarterfinals

Final Four

Bracket

Semifinals

Final

See also
2017–18 Israeli Basketball Premier League

References

2018
Cup